The 2007 Camping World Watkins Glen Grand Prix was a race in the 2007 IRL IndyCar Series, held at Watkins Glen International. It was held over the weekend of July 6–8, 2007, as the tenth round of the seventeen-race calendar.

Race Summary
Helio Castroneves started on pole, but after leading the first 19 laps, he crashed out under heavy pressure from 
Scott Dixon. Dixon, who led 23 laps, held off Sam Hornish Jr. to win the race. However a post-race brawl occurred. Tony Kanaan was angry with Sam Hornish Jr. for a previous wreck and said he wanted to talk with Hornish after the race. On pit road Kanaan and Hornish walked up to have a civil talk about their incident when Sam Hornish Sr. tried to defend his son by wrestling Tony Kanaan. A brawl broke out and Sam Hornish Sr. had to be physically restrained by IndyCar officials and security. Michael Andretti tried to get into the brawl but Marco Andretti held his father back while driver Dan Wheldon helped Kanaan out of the brawl.

"I got a run on Tony into Turn 6, but he didn't give me room and ran me up on the curbs," Hornish explained. "I had nowhere to go. Then he runs into me coming into the pits and starts calling me every name under the sun. He likes to talk about what a great teammate he is when someone on his team wins, but he can't handle it when he doesn't. It's an unfortunate deal. For a guy that likes to claim he's such a great sport, he's always doing stuff like that. If he wants to get out and talk to me about it afterwards, he can do that. But you don't do it in the car. Someone could have gotten hurt in the pits."

"He hits me and almost takes me out of the race, and he gets mad," Kanaan said in his post-race interview. "He drives like a champion all the time, but mistakes happen and people should let us talk about it and not get in the middle. I think he made a mistake today, and I don't know if he was going to apologize because I couldn't hear what he was saying -- we both had our helmets on. I don't think he drove like a champion today, and he didn't act like one. And his dad was even worse. That's why dads should be in the grandstands, not in the pits."

For punching Kanaan and interfering with the intended civil discussion, Sam Hornish Sr., was fined $25,000 and banned from the garages for one race. Kanaan and Hornish Jr. were both fined $25,000 and put on indefinite probation.

Classification

Full Course Caution Periods
There were three full course caution periods during the race, with a total of seven laps run under full course yellow.

References
IndyCar Series 

Camping World Watkins Glen Grand Prix
Camping World Watkins Glen Grand Prix
Camping World Watkins Glen Grand Prix
Watkins Glen Indy Grand Prix